Beverly Boulevard station (formerly Beverly Hills) is a SEPTA Media-Sharon Hill Trolley Line station in Upper Darby, Pennsylvania. It is officially located at Garrett Road and Bywood Avenue, but also includes Beverly Boulevard. The station serves both Routes 101 and 102. Only local service is provided on both lines. The station contains two platforms with plexiglass bus-type shelters on both sides of the tracks.

Trolleys arriving at this station travel between 69th Street Terminal further east in Upper Darby and either Orange Street in Media, Pennsylvania for the Route 101 line, or Sharon Hill, Pennsylvania for the Route 102 line. Both lines run parallel to Garrett Road and Bywood Avenue, a one-way street that runs west from the Fairfield Avenue stop. Beverly Hills is the westernmost stop where the lines runs parallel to both streets.
 
Beverly Boulevard Station is located at the east end of the Beverly Hills Trestle, which originally went over a former right-of-way of the Newtown Square Branch of the Pennsylvania Railroad, a line that ended just west of Fernwood-Yeadon Station on the Media/Wawa Line. That ROW is now part of Naylors Run Park. Beverly Hills station is also one block west of the Hilltop Road trolley stop.

Station layout

References

External links

 Station from Google Maps Street View

SEPTA Media–Sharon Hill Line stations